George Styles (23 January 1904 – 27 February 1984) was an Australian rules footballer who played with Carlton and North Melbourne in the Victorian Football League (VFL).

Notes

External links 

George Styles's profile at Blueseum

1904 births
1984 deaths
Carlton Football Club players
North Melbourne Football Club players
Port Melbourne Football Club players
Australian rules footballers from Victoria (Australia)